Blagun Glacier is the 13 km long and 2.3 km wide glacier on Pernik Peninsula, Loubet Coast in Graham Land, Antarctica, situated southwest of Dolie Glacier and northeast of Peyna Glacier.  It flows northwestwards between Lane Ridge and Hodge Ridge, and joins Wilkinson Glacier.

The glacier is named after the settlement of Blagun in Southern Bulgaria.

Location
British mapping in 1976.

See also
 List of glaciers in the Antarctic
 Glaciology

Maps
 Antarctic Digital Database (ADD). Scale 1:250000 topographic map of Antarctica. Scientific Committee on Antarctic Research (SCAR). Since 1993, regularly upgraded and updated.
British Antarctic Territory. Scale 1:200000 topographic map. DOS 610 Series, Sheet W 66 64. Directorate of Overseas Surveys, Tolworth, UK, 1976.
British Antarctic Territory. Scale 1:200000 topographic map. DOS 610 Series, Sheet W 66 66. Directorate of Overseas Surveys, Tolworth, UK, 1976.

References
 Bulgarian Antarctic Gazetteer. Antarctic Place-names Commission. (details in Bulgarian, basic data in English)
Blagun Glacier. SCAR Composite Antarctic Gazetteer.

External links
 Blagun Glacier. Copernix satellite image

Bulgaria and the Antarctic
Glaciers of Loubet Coast